William Welsh (2 May 1904 – 1978) was a Scottish professional footballer who played as an inside forward. He made appearances in the Scottish and English football league throughout his career.

References

1904 births
1978 deaths
Scottish footballers
Association football forwards
English Football League players
Douglas Water Thistle F.C. players
Heart of Midlothian F.C. players
Dundee United F.C. players
Charlton Athletic F.C. players
Wigan Borough F.C. players
Southport F.C. players
Newport County A.F.C. players
Connah's Quay & Shotton F.C. players
Wrexham A.F.C. players
Gateshead A.F.C. players
Hartlepool United F.C. players
Jarrow F.C. players